is a Japanese publishing company wholly owned by Fuji Media Holdings and part of the Fujisankei Communications Group.

History

In 1987, Fusosha Co., Ltd merged with Sankyo Publishing Co., Ltd, a division of Sankei Shimbun, itself also part the Fujisankei Communications Group.

In 2007, Fuji TV acquired additional shares of Fusosha and Pony Canyon to make them wholly owned subsidiaries.

In addition to the numerous magazines and textbooks it has published, Fusosha has sold monograph for programs of its sister companies Fuji TV and Nippon Broadcasting System, including All Night Nippon and Waratte Iitomo!.

External links
 Official website 

Publishing companies established in 1987
1987 establishments in Japan
Fujisankei Communications Group
Book publishing companies in Tokyo
Magazine publishing companies in Tokyo